Future Blues may refer to:

 Future Blues (Cowboy Bebop album)
 Future Blues (Canned Heat album), 1970